Victoria Hill is an actress.

Victoria Hill may also refer to:

 Victoria Blyth Hill (born 1945), American art conservator
 Victoria Hill, location in New Westminster, Canada
Victoria Hill, Queensland, a locality in the Toowoomba and Southern Downs Region, Australia
 Victoria Hill (Riverside County), United States

See also

 Mount Victoria (disambiguation)
 Victoria Peak (disambiguation)
 
 Victoria (disambiguation)
 Hill (disambiguation)